William James Frecklington , known as "W. J." or "Jim" (born c.1949 in Parkes, NSW, Australia), is a maker of carriages.

After working in the Arctic, he moved to England, and was engaged at Windsor Castle, and later moved to the Royal Mews in London, caring for the Royal ceremonial horses and driving the carriages on ceremonial occasions. He also served as an outrider at Ascot.

In 1977 he was invited to manage the Queen's Silver Jubilee Exhibition during its tour of Australia, and following that he built a replica of Edward VII's 1902 State Landau.

He then went on to build Queen Elizabeth's Australian State Coach, which was presented to the Queen on the occasion of the Australian Bicentennial in 1988.

A new British state coach constructed on Frecklington's initiative, the Diamond Jubilee State Coach (also known as the State Coach Britannia), was first used during the State Opening of Parliament in June 2014.

Another new coach has been constructed for the Coronation of Charles III and Camilla in May 2023, which the king and queen will reportedly use for the Coronation Procession.

External links
The State Coach Britannia at downau.com (with images)
The British Monarchy official website - Carriages in the Royal Collection

References

Living people
People from New South Wales
Coachbuilders of Australia
1949 births